A first-price sealed-bid auction (FPSBA) is a common type of auction. It is also known as blind auction. In this type of auction, all bidders simultaneously submit sealed bids so that no bidder knows the bid of any other participant. The highest bidder pays the price that was submitted.

Strategic analysis 
In a FPSBA, each bidder is characterized by their monetary valuation of the item for sale.

Then, if Alice is rational:
If she bids exactly , then she will not lose but also not gain any positive value.

Unfortunately, Alice does not know what the other bidders are going to bid. Moreover, she does not even know the valuations of the other bidders. Hence, strategically, we have a Bayesian game - a game in which agents do not know the payoffs of the other agents.

The interesting challenge in such a game is to find a Bayesian Nash equilibrium. However, this is not easy even when there are only two bidders. The situation is simpler when the valuations of the bidders are i.i.d. random variables, i.e.: there is a known prior distribution and the valuations of the bidders are all drawn from the same distribution.

Example 
Then, it is a Bayesian-Nash equilibrium when each bidder bids exactly half his/her value: Alice bids  and Bob bids .

PROOF: The proof takes the point-of-view of Alice. We assume that she knows that Bob bids , but she does not know . We find the best response of Alice to Bob's strategy. Suppose Alice bids . There are two cases:
 . This happens with probability .
 . Then Alice loses and her net gain is 0. This happens with probability .
All in all, Alice's expected gain is: . The maximum gain is attained when . The derivative is (see Inverse functions and differentiation):

and it is zero when Alice's bid  satisfies:

Now, since we are looking for a symmetric equilibrium, we also want Alice's bid  to equal . So we have:

The solution of this differential equation is: .

Generalization 
Denote by:
  - the valuation of bidder ;
  - the maximum valuation of all bidders except , i.e., .
Then, a FPSBA has a unique symmetric BNE in which the bid of player  is given by:

Incentive-compatible variant 
The FPSBA is not incentive-compatible even in the weak sense of Bayesian-Nash-Incentive-Compatibility (BNIC), since there is no Bayesian-Nash equilibrium in which bidders report their true value.

However, it is easy to create a variant of FPSBA which is BNIC, if the priors on the valuations are common knowledge. For example, for the case of Alice and Bob described above, the rules of the BNIC variant are:
 The highest bidder wins;
 The highest bidder pays 1/2 of his/her bid.
In effect, this variant simulates the Bayesian-Nash equilibrium strategies of the players, so in the Bayesian-Nash equilibrium, both bidders bid their true value.

This example is a special case of a much more general principle: the revelation principle.

Comparison to second-price auction 

The following table compares FPSBA to sealed-bid second-price auction (SPSBA):

The auctioneer's revenue is calculated in the example case, in which the valuations of the agents are drawn independently and uniformly at random from [0,1]. As an example, when there are  agents:
In both cases, the auctioneer's expected revenue is 1/3.

This fact that the revenue is the same is not a coincidence - it is a special case of the revenue equivalence theorem. This holds only when the agents' valuations are statistically independent; when the valuations are dependent, we have a common value auction, and in this case, the revenue in a second-price auction is usually higher than in a first-price auction.

The item for sale may not be sold if the final bid is not high enough to satisfy the seller, that is, the seller reserves the right to accept or reject the highest bid. If the seller announces to the bidders the reserve price, it is a public reserve price auction.  In contrast, if the seller does not announce the reserve price before the sale but only after the sale, it is a secret reserve price auction.

Comparison to other auctions 
A FPSBA is distinct from the English auction in that bidders can only submit one bid each. Furthermore, as bidders cannot see the bids of other participants, they cannot adjust their own bids accordingly.

FPSBA has been argued to be strategically equivalent to the Dutch auction.

What are effectively FPSBA are commonly called tendering for procurement by companies and organizations, particularly for government contracts and auctions for mining leases. FPSBA are thought to lead to low procurement costs through competition and low corruption through increased transparency, even though they may entail a higher ex-post extra cost of the completed project and extra time to complete it.

A generalized first-price auction is a non-truthful auction mechanism for sponsored search (aka position auction).

A generalization of both 1st-price and 2nd-price auctions is an auction in which the price is some convex combination of the 1st and 2nd price.

References

Further reading 
  Combinatorial auctions for transportation services procurement with first-price sealed-bid rules.

External links 
 Nash equilibrium in first price auction - in math.stackexchange.com.

Types of auction